Tetragonoderus extremus is a species of beetle in the family Carabidae. It was described by Bedel in 1905.

References

extremus
Beetles described in 1905